Bette Mildred Stephenson Pengelly  (July 31, 1924 – August 19, 2019) was a Canadian medical doctor and politician in Ontario. She served in the Legislative Assembly of Ontario from 1975 to 1987, and was a cabinet minister in the Progressive Conservative governments of Bill Davis and Frank Miller.

Background
Stephenson was born in Aurora, Ontario, the daughter of Clara Mildred (Draper) and Carl Melvin Stephenson. She graduated from Earl Haig Secondary School in North York, Ontario in 1941 and was the only female in her class to go on to university. She entered University of Toronto Medical School at the age of 17, a year younger than what was then the minimum age for admission, after persuading the dean to waive both the rule and the $680 tuition fee.

She attained her medical degree from the University of Toronto in 1946. Stephenson practised medicine for more than 40 years. She was a member of the medical staff, a Director of the Outpatient Department, and Chief of the Department of General Practice at Women's College Hospital. She was also a member of the medical staff at North York General Hospital.

She was a founding member of the College of General Practice in Canada, now known as the College of Family Physicians of Canada. She was also the first female member of the board of directors of the Ontario Medical Association and the Canadian Medical Association, and served as the first female president of both organizations. In 1974, she released a report stating that there were too many foreign-born students at the University of Toronto, particularly from China. The statements she made led some Chinese physicians to create the Federation of Chinese Canadian Professionals of Ontario which later became the Chinese Canadian Medical Society.

On behalf of the CMA, she lobbied then-Justice Minister Pierre Trudeau to remove abortion from the Criminal Code. According to Stephenson, he agreed to do so, but then reneged and instead introduced amendments to the Criminal Code that provided for abortions only when the health of the woman was in danger as determined by a three-doctor hospital committee.

Politics
Stephenson was elected to the Legislative Assembly of Ontario in the 1975 provincial election, representing the constituency of York Mills in North York. She was appointed to Bill Davis' cabinet as Minister of Labour on October 7, 1975. She won a convincing re-election victory over Liberal candidate Wilfred Caplan in the 1977 election.

On August 18, 1978, she was named Minister of Education and Minister of Colleges and Universities. As Minister, she ordered Toronto schools to use the Lord's Prayer during opening or closing exercise instead of silent meditation. She was returned to the legislature with the largest majority of her career in the 1981 provincial election.

Stephenson was a driving force behind the ICON computer project, in which a thin client networked computer was designed and built to Ontario specifications for classroom use. Introduced in 1984, the ICON was controversial and was eventually orphaned with support discontinued in 1994.

Stephenson was not informed of Davis's decision in 1984 to extend full funding to Catholic high schools until the policy had already been decided, and was privately opposed but did not resign from cabinet in protest due to her loyalty to Davis.

The Progressive Conservatives under Davis was considered a Red Tory party, however, Stephenson was on the party's conservative wing. She considered running to succeed Davis at the January 1985 PC Party of Ontario leadership convention but did not want to split the vote with fellow right-winger Frank Miller who was also considering running, so the two agreed that only one of them would run. When Miller decided to announce his candidacy, Stephenson supported him prominently.

When Miller replaced Davis as Premier of Ontario on February 8, 1985, he named Stephenson as the Chair of the Management Board of Cabinet.

Under Miller's leadership, the Progressive Conservatives were reduced to a tenuous minority government in the 1985 provincial election. Stephenson was personally re-elected without difficulty, and was named as Ontario's first female Treasurer and Deputy Premier on May 17. She accomplished little in these roles. Before having the chance as Treasurer to present a budget, the Miller government was defeated by a motion of non-confidence in June 1985, after the Liberals reached an agreement allowing them to form government with the support of the Ontario New Democratic Party. In opposition, she served as her party's Critic for Health. She retired from politics at the 1987 provincial election.

Cabinet positions

After politics
In the 1990s, Stephenson was appointed as a board member on the province's new Education Quality and Accountability Office, which monitors and reports to the public on the performance of the education system. From 1997 to 2005, she was chair of the Learning Opportunities Task Force. and was involved with the Gwillimbury Foundation in its attempt to build a university in Queensville, Ontario. She is a founding member of the Canadian Institute for Advanced Research and also served on the boards of the Ontario Innovation Trust and on the police services board overseeing the Ontario Provincial Police.

In 1992, she was made an Officer of the Order of Canada in recognition for having "made exceptional contributions to society throughout her career". In 1999, she was awarded the Order of Ontario and the Governor General's Award in Commemoration of the Persons Case. The Bette Stephenson Centre for Learning, a York Region District School Board school in Richmond Hill offering adult education programs, was named after her. In 2013, she was inducted into the Canadian Medical Hall of Fame.

Stephenson died in Richmond Hill on August 19, 2019, at the age of 95.

References

Notes

Citations

External links
 

1924 births
2019 deaths
Canadian general practitioners
Women government ministers of Canada
Deputy premiers of Ontario
Finance ministers of Ontario
Members of the Order of Ontario
Officers of the Order of Canada
Officers of the Order of St John
People from Aurora, Ontario
Progressive Conservative Party of Ontario MPPs
University of Toronto alumni
Female finance ministers
Women MPPs in Ontario
20th-century Canadian politicians
20th-century Canadian women politicians
Governor General's Award in Commemoration of the Persons Case winners